Annales Zoologici is a quarterly peer-reviewed scientific journal covering all aspects of systematic zoology. Established in 1951, it is published by the Museum and Institute of Zoology of the Polish Academy of Sciences.

External links 
 

Zoology journals
Polish Academy of Sciences academic journals
English-language journals
Systematics journals
Quarterly journals
Publications established in 1951
Academic journals published by museums